The Test may refer to:

 "The Test" (short story), short story by Franz Kafka
 The Test (Wright novel), novel by Mary Tappan Wright
 The Test (Applegate novel), a 2000 novel in the Animorphs series
 "Come with Us"/"The Test", a 2002 single by The Chemical Brothers
 The Test (play), a 2007 Lukas Bärfuss play
 The Test (1914 film), an American short film starring Wallace Reid and Frank Lloyd
 The Test (1916 film), an American silent drama film
 The Test (1935 film), an American film directed by Bernard B. Ray
 The Test (talk show), an American syndicated talk show
 The Test (Australian TV series), an Australian docu-series
 The Test (greyhound competition), England

Television episodes 
 "The Test" (Dad's Army), an episode of the British comedy series Dad's Army
 "The Test" (Land of the Lost), an episode of the American television series Land of the Lost
 "The Test", an episode of The O.C.

See also
 Test (disambiguation)